Matthews Exchange was a transit exchange located on Highway 99 at the Ladner Trunk Road interchange. Opened on April 20, 1987, the exchange is primarily served by the 351 to Richmond and South Surrey. On September 7, 2020, the exchange closed and its designation was dropped, but buses that used to serve this exchange continue to do so.

Stops 54876 and 54878 are located on the north side of Highway 99 while stops 54877 and 55179 are located on the south side.

Routes

See also
List of bus routes in Metro Vancouver

References

External links
Matthews Exchange map (PDF file)

TransLink (British Columbia) bus stations